49 (forty-nine) is the natural number following 48 and preceding 50.

In mathematics
Forty-nine is the square of seven.

It appears in the Padovan sequence, preceded by the terms 21, 28, 37 (it is the sum of the first two of these).

Along with the number that immediately derives from it, 77, the only number under 100 not having its home prime known.

Decimal representation 

The sum of the digits of the square of 49 (2401) is the square root of 49.

49 is the first square where the digits are squares. In this case, 4 and 9 are squares.

Reciprocal 

The fraction  is a repeating decimal with a period of 42:

 =  (42 digits repeat)

There are 42 (note that this number is the period) positive integers that are less than 49 and coprime to 49. Multiplying 020408163265306122448979591836734693877551 by each of these integers results in a cyclic permutation of the original number:

020408163265306122448979591836734693877551 × 2 = 040816326530612244897959183673469387755102
020408163265306122448979591836734693877551 × 3 = 061224489795918367346938775510204081632653
020408163265306122448979591836734693877551 × 4 = 081632653061224489795918367346938775510204
...

The repeating number can be obtained from 02 and repetition of doubles placed at two places to the right:

 02
   04
     08
       16
         32
           64
            128
              256
                512
                 1024
                   2048
 +                   ...
 ----------------------
 020408163265306122448979591836734693877551...0204081632...

because  satisfies:

In chemistry
 The atomic number of indium.
 During the Manhattan Project, plutonium was also often referred to simply as "49". Number 4 was for the last digit in 94 (atomic number of plutonium) and 9 for the last digit in Pu-239, the weapon-grade fissile isotope used in nuclear bombs.

In astronomy
 Messier object M49, a magnitude 10.0 galaxy in the constellation Virgo.
 The New General Catalogue object NGC 49, a spiral galaxy in the constellation Cetus.

In religion
 In Judaism, the number of days of the Counting of the Omer
 The number of days and night Siddhartha Gautama spent meditating as a holy man
 In Buddhism, 49 days is one of the lengths of the intermediate state (bardo)

In sports

 49er, a member of the San Francisco 49ers team of the National Football League (United States football).
 Arsenal had a 49-game unbeaten run between May 2003 and October 2004 until they lost to Manchester United, which is a national record in English football.
 Rocky Marciano ended his boxing career as the only heavyweight champion with a perfect record—49 wins in 49 professional bouts, with 43 knockouts.
 Indian Premier League cricket team Royal Challengers Bangalore holds the lowest ever team total in IPL history in the 2017 edition of IPL

In music

 "49 Bye-Byes", a song on the self-titled album Crosby Stills and Nash
 "Days of '49", a 19th century folk song about the California Gold Rush, recorded by Bob Dylan (on the album Self Portrait) and by many others
 49:00... Of Your Time/Life is a one-track solo album by Paul Westerberg.
 In Blues music lore, it was at the junction of US Highway 49 and 61 in Clarksdale, Mississippi, that legendary bluesman Robert Johnson sold his soul to the devil in return for fame and success. In later years Howlin' Wolf immortalized the road in the song "Highway 49", originally written by Big Joe Williams.

In other fields

Forty-nine is:
 HP-49 series is a Hewlett Packard calculator
 49er, one who participated in the 1849 California Gold Rush.
 The code for international direct dial phone calls to Germany
 In the title of Thomas Pynchon's novel The Crying of Lot 49
 In the title of the movies Ladder 49 and 49 Up
 A 49 is a party after a powwow or any gathering of American Indians, held by the participants. It is also type of song that is sung on such occasions. A 49 is typically held in an isolated place and features drumming and singing.
 49th parallel between Canada and the US
 Japanese GS1 country code
 The number of the French department Maine-et-Loire

See also
 List of highways numbered 49

References

Integers